Alejandro Ariceaga (1949–2004) was a Mexican writer and journalist.

Works
 Seven Stories Alexandrians (1967)
 Other People (1973)
 The Old Chameleon Secret Identity (1980)
 A Short Term (1981)
 Temperate Weather (1983)
 City As Beautiful As Any (1985)
 Placeres3 (2001)
 Litter Damn (2002)

1949 births
2004 deaths
Mexican journalists
Male journalists
Mexican male writers
Place of birth missing
Place of death missing
20th-century journalists